Metropolitano is a bus rapid transit system serving the city of Lima, Peru. Its construction began in the year 2006.

History 
The origins of the Metropolitano go back to the Lima Bus project, which was planned and proposed during the administration of former mayor Alberto Andrade Carmona.

Its construction began in the year 2006 during Luis Castañeda Lossio's first period as Mayor of Lima.

It was put into service on July 28, 2010, during the second term of former mayor Luis Castañeda.

On March 18, 2019, the mayor of Lima, Jorge Muñoz announced the expansion work of the Metropolitano line, which consists of the construction of a 12-kilometer road from Naranjal station, in Independencia, to Chimpu Ocllo avenue, in Carabayllo.

This system is similar to the TransMilenio of Bogota, and inspired of the previous system that existed on the city the National Urban Transport Company (In spanish: Empresa Nacional de Transporte Urbano-ENATRU) which was the first urban transport system in Peru, that also even inspired other companies such as the Rede Integrada de Transporte (which started the era of BRT).

In September 2020, the Metropolitano begins to be controlled and administered by the Authority for Urban Transport in Lima and Callao, an institution that reports directly to MTC and from the Peruvian government. In fact, the Metropolitano is no longer administered by the Municipality of Lima

Services

Regular Service 
These routes stop in all stations. "Regular A," "Regular B" and "Regular C" services are included in this category.

Regular A  
Emancipacion and Jr. Lampa in Downtown Lima. Skyblue is used by this bus route as its color.

Regular B 
Currently, this is the only bus route that stops in all stations from Estación Naranjal to Estación Matellini. Unlike Regular A, it goes through Av. Alfonso Ugarte and Av. España. Orange is used by this bus route as its color.

Regular C 
This bus route begins in Estación Ramón Castilla and finishes in Estación Matellini  going through Av. Emancipación and Jr. Lampa in Downtown Lima. Green is used by this bus route as its color.

Express Services
There are nine Express services which stops only at designated stations.

Stops 

bold indicates Express stops

Payment
Fares are paid through an Electronic Prepaid Card which can be purchased and refilled at any station in the system. There is a flat fee of S/. 3.50 (3.50 new soles, approximately US$0.89) for regular commuters. This originally was S/. 1.50, but it was raised in December 2012 to S/. 2.00, got raised again so that by February 2015 (or earlier) it became S/. 2.50. And in 2022 it got raised again to S/. 3.50. The card can be bought at a vending machine, which is available on every station, and will cost S/. 4.50. It can be charged up to S/. 100.00. The machines accept both coins and bills, but payment with bank cards (either debit or credit) is not possible.

There are separate Electronic Prepaid Cards available for students, either for university or for normal schools. These can only be obtained through a sales office, and are put on name. These are charged a lower rate, but can be recharged at the same vending machines. Firefighters as well as members of the police are not required to pay and do not have to possess any of these cards.

Buses
The buses are powered by natural gas, purchased from Chinese manufacturers King Long and Bonluck. The system uses about 300 of these gray-colored buses.

Smaller buses are used as feeders to each of the main stations (Naranjal, Estacion Central and Matellini). Those painted yellow can carry up to 80 passengers, while orange ones can only carry 40.

See also
 Lima Metro
 List of bus rapid transit systems

References

External links 
 Official Web Page of Metropolitano BRT (in Spanish)

Public transport in Peru
Transport in Lima
Rapid transit in Peru